Abdulrahman Mohammed Ali Hussain (Arabic:عبد الرحمن محمد) (born 16 March 1988) is a Qatari footballer.

External links

References

Qatari footballers
1988 births
Living people
Al Ahli SC (Doha) players
Lekhwiya SC players
Al-Wakrah SC players
Qatar SC players
Al-Sailiya SC players
Al Kharaitiyat SC players
Qatar Stars League players
Qatari Second Division players
Association football midfielders